The Rochester Hotel, at 726 E. Second Ave. in Durango, Colorado, was built in 1909.  It was listed on the National Register of Historic Places in 1996.

Its construction was begun in 1890.  E.T. Peeples took over construction in 1891.  It was completed in 1892 by new owners J.E. Schutt and W.C. Chapman.

References

National Register of Historic Places in La Plata County, Colorado

Commercial buildings completed in 1909
Hotels in Colorado
Hotel buildings on the National Register of Historic Places in Colorado
Buildings and structures completed in 1892